Piotrowski signs are ten signs of organic brain disease that can be found from having patients analyze Rorschach tests. They were identified by Zygmunt Piotrowski, who analyzed the Rorschach test interpretations of patients with organic brain disease, central nervous system diseases (non-cerebral), and conversion disorder. He found that the patients with cortical-subcortical damage (those with organic brain disease) had interpretations that were more abnormal than those with non-cerebral organic abnormalities and conversion disorder.

References 

Brain disorders